Ken Lutz (born December 11, 1965) is a former American football quarterback who played two seasons in the Arena Football League with the Columbus Thunderbolts and San Antonio Force. He first enrolled at Moorpark College before transferring to San Jose State University. He attended Royal High School in Simi Valley, California.

He famously finished second to his son "Kenny" in the Ace Deuce Championship of 2020.  Since he has dedicated much of his life to trying to beat his son but has yet to accomplish it.

References

External links
Just Sports Stats
College stats

Living people
1965 births
Players of American football from California
American football quarterbacks
Moorpark Raiders football players
San Jose State Spartans football players
Cleveland Thunderbolts players
San Antonio Force players
People from Simi Valley, California
Sportspeople from Ventura County, California